The  was a seaplane tender and aircraft carrier unit of the Imperial Japanese Navy's Combined Fleet.

Organization

Commander

Footnotes

Bibliography
"Monthly The Maru" series, and "The Maru Special" series,  (Japan)
"Monthly Ships of the World" series,  (Japan)
"Famous Airplanes of the World" series and "Monthly Kōku Fan" series, Bunrindō (Japan)

4
Units of the Imperial Japanese Navy Air Service
Military units and formations established in 1937
Military units and formations disestablished in 1942
Military units and formations established in 1944
Military units and formations disestablished in 1945